The Treasurer of Victoria is the title held by the Cabinet Minister who is responsible for the financial management of the budget sector in the Australian state of Victoria. This primarily includes:
 preparation and delivery of the annual State Budget;
 revenue collection for Victoria, including stamp duty, payroll tax, financial institutions duty and land tax;
 borrowing, investment and financial arrangements to hedge, protect or manage the State’s financial interests;
 promoting economic growth across Victoria; and
 providing investment and fund management services to the State and its statutory authorities.

List of Victorian treasurers (prior to 1935)
While Victoria ceased to be a colony in 1901, the Treasurer in Victoria continued to have the formal title Colonial Tresurer until 1935.

List of Victorian treasurers (since 1935)

Prior to 1979, the roles of Premier and Treasurer were usually held by the same person.

References

Victoria
 
Victoria (Australia)-related lists
Treasurer of Victoria
1851 establishments in Australia